Tudor Hall is a historic home located at Bel Air, Harford County, Maryland, United States. It is a -story Gothic Revival cottage built of painted brick. The house was built as a country retreat by Junius Brutus Booth (1796–1852) from Plates 44 and 45, Design XVII, of The Architect, by William H. Ranlett, 1847. However, Booth never lived in Tudor Hall, because he died before it was completed.  His son Edwin Booth lived there only briefly on his return from California before he moved the family back into Baltimore.  But his other son, John Wilkes Booth, lived there with his mother, brother Joseph, and two sisters from December 1852 through most of 1856.

After the family moved out, they rented the home to the King family and later sold it to Sam Kyle and Ella Mahoney. She lived in Tudor Hall for 70 years and opened a museum.  After her death the house passed through a succession of owners, including the Worthington family, who owned the Aegis  newspaper.  Finally the house was sold to the Foxes, who reopened Mahoney's museum.

Tudor Hall was listed on the National Register of Historic Places in 1973.  A modification to its listing, to decrease its boundaries, was registered in 1982.  After the Preservation Association of Tudor Hall (PATH) collapsed, Tudor Hall was sold to the Bakers and later to Harford County, who are now in possession of the historic home.

The house is currently the home of the Junius B. Booth Society, a group of volunteers dedicated to the preservation and interpretation of the historic home. Tudor Hall is open for tours on select Sundays from April until November and during special events hosted by the Society.

References

External links

Junius B. Booth Society, Inc.
Spirits of Tudor Hall - tour site
Center for the Arts
, including undated photo, Maryland Historical Trust website

Booth family residences
Houses on the National Register of Historic Places in Maryland
Houses completed in 1847
Gothic Revival architecture in Maryland
Historic house museums in Maryland
Museums in Harford County, Maryland
Houses in Bel Air, Harford County, Maryland
1847 establishments in Maryland
National Register of Historic Places in Harford County, Maryland